Deborah Findlay (born 23 December 1947) is an English actress. She joined a theatre company while studying English at the University of Leeds.

Career
Findlay has worked primarily on stage and appeared in numerous productions, including the original Top Girls. In the 1980s she worked with the Royal Shakespeare Company where she appeared in Twelfth Night and The Merchant Of Venice. In 1997 she won an Olivier Award, as well as Outer Critics' Circle Award for Outstanding Featured Actress in a Play, for her performance as Hilda, the wife of the painter Stanley Spencer in Pam Gems' play Stanley. In 2008 she starred in the US premiere of Vincent River by Philip Ridley. In 2009 she appeared alongside Judi Dench in a Donmar West End revival of Madame de Sade. In 2013 she starred in the Donmar Warehouse production of Coriolanus as Volumnia, a role which earned her Clarence Derwent award for best supporting actress. In 2016 she appeared on the stage of The Royal Court Theatre twice: as Sally in Caryl Churchill's Escaped Alone and as Hazel in Lucy Kirkwood's The Children. She reprised her role during The Children's Broadway run, receiving a Tony Award nomination. In 2018, she appeared at the Bridge Theatre in London, playing the role of Sister Gilchrist in Alan Bennett's Allelujah!

Her TV credits include Nurse Motte 1992 Maigret with Michael Gambon, Gillian in the ITV drama The Last Train (1999), the recurring character Greer Thornton in four of the six episodes of State of Play and in the episode "The French Drop" (2004) in Foyle's War. She also appeared in four episodes of the 2001 series of The Armstrong and Miller Show and one episode of the acclaimed and original entry of the Messiah TV series. In autumn 2007 she appeared with Judi Dench, Imelda Staunton and Francesca Annis in the BBC1 costume drama series Cranford, playing the role of the spinster Miss Augusta Tomkinson, as well as in Wilfred Owen: A Remembrance Tale. She reprised her (in this case more prominent) role as Miss Tomkinson in the two-part Christmas special Return to Cranford. She portrayed Home Secretary Denise Riley in Torchwood's 2009 third series Children of Earth.  She was featured in separate episodes as agent Mary Carter in October 2003 and lawyer Gemma King in January 2010 of the BBC1 series Silent Witness. In 2010 she also appeared in Agatha Christie’s Poirot  “Hallowe’en Party” as Rowena Drake. She also appeared in two episodes of the ITV series Midsomer Murders: as Hilary Richards in "Blue Herrings" (2000) and as Lorna Sloane in "Murder by Magic" (2015). Acted as Sarah Cushing in the television episode of "Sherlock Holmes - The Cardboard Box", 11 April 1994.

In episodes aired in 2018, 2020 and 2022 she portrayed Ruth in three series of the BBC TV legal drama The Split.

Her radio credits include Sally in Closed to Visitors by Dawn Lowe-Watson on BBC Radio 4 in 1992 and Hermione Pink in the BBC Radio 4 Drama The Ferryhill Philosophers, starting in 2015

References

External links

1947 births
English film actresses
English radio actresses
English stage actresses
English television actresses
English voice actresses
Living people
People from Leatherhead
Laurence Olivier Award winners
Royal Shakespeare Company members
English Shakespearean actresses
20th-century English actresses
21st-century English actresses